Maureen Wall (née McGeehin, 1918 – June 1972) was an Irish historian with a focus on the 18th century. She is regarded as pioneer of modern studies of the Penal Laws in Ireland.

Life and work
Born Maureen McGeehin in County Donegal, Wall became the leading authority on Irish history in the 18th century.

Wall was educated in the Irish speaking boarding school in Falcarragh. She trained as a primary teacher in Carysfort College before going on to get a degree at night. She was also a member of the local Gaelic League. In 1944 Wall contracted TB which meant she spent significant time in hospitals in Dún Laoghaire and Switzerland. This ill health eventually forced her to leave teaching. She took a position in the Folk Commission where she met her husband, the Commission librarian Tom Wall.

She married in 1954 and through her thesis supervisor had taken a position in the Irish History department. Wall eventually become one of the most respected lecturers at University College Dublin. Her career in terms of titles had been varied as Dudley Edwards had been determined to have her in the department and used what ever job title was available to ensure she was employed. She launched the Dublin Historical Association pamphlets in 1961 with her work on the Penal Laws. Through this she won the National University of Ireland historical prize. Her interpretation of various Irish events became the standard interpretation for years.

Wall is remembered by a medal which is awarded to History students for obtaining first place in the second year history exam in UCD. These awards have been endowed by her friends.

Bibliography 

The Irish struggle, 1916-1926 edited by Desmond Williams. -Chapter /Partition : the Ulster question (1916-1926)

A Glimpse of Town and Country in Eighteenth-Century Ireland, 1971, by Wall, Maureen & Simms, J. G.
 The Rise of a Catholic Middle Class in Eighteenth-Century Ireland, Irish Historical Studies, 1958, Cambridge University Press

References

Further reading 
Maureen Wall, Catholic Ireland in the Eighteenth Century

Irish women novelists
Irish poets
1918 births
1972 deaths
Alumni of Carysfort College